Events in the year 1936 in Portugal.

Incumbents
 President: Óscar Carmona
 Prime Minister: António de Oliveira Salazar

Events
 Minho Province established
 1936 Naval Revolt (Portugal)

Arts and entertainment

Sports
 FC Felgueiras founded
 C.F. Os Unidos founded

Births

 25 July – Carlos Mota Pinto, law professor and politician (died 1985)
 31 August – Otelo Saraiva de Carvalho, military officer (died 2021).
 7 November – Maria Nápoles, fencer (born in Mozambique).

Deaths

References

 
1930s in Portugal
Years of the 20th century in Portugal
Portugal